Chim Pui-chung (born 1946 in Chaozhou, Guangdong, China) was a member of the Legislative Council of Hong Kong (Legco), representing the Financial Services Functional Constituency. He is director of several companies.

Political career
Chim was a legislative councillor from 1991 until he was jailed for conspiring to forge documents in 1998, whereupon he was impeached and disqualified as a legislator by Legco.  He was released from prison in 1999.  In 2004, he was re-elected unopposed as legislative councillor for the financial services constituency.  In 2008 he was again elected.

In 2005, he was an unsuccessful candidate in the Hong Kong Chief Executive election, receiving only 21 nominations from the Election Committee, less than the minimum requirement of 100. As a result, Donald Tsang was declared the uncontested winner.

Career 
In November 2021, he was charged with fraud, along with his son, Ricky Chim Kim-lun, and Wong Pei Li.

Family 
His son, Ricky Chim Kim-lun, is a member of the Election Committee and is also an honorary consul of Papua New Guinea.

References

1946 births
Living people
Hong Kong criminals
Hong Kong financial businesspeople
Businesspeople from Guangdong
Politicians from Chaozhou
Members of the Selection Committee of Hong Kong
Members of the Provisional Legislative Council
HK LegCo Members 1991–1995
HK LegCo Members 1995–1997
HK LegCo Members 1998–2000
HK LegCo Members 2004–2008
HK LegCo Members 2008–2012
Hong Kong politicians convicted of crimes